Ryan Wright (born June 1, 2000) is an American football punter for the Minnesota Vikings of the National Football League (NFL). He played college football at Tulane.

Early life and high school
Wright grew up in San Ramon, California and attended California High School. In addition to punting, Wright also played quarterback during his junior and senior years.

College career
Wright attended Tulane. He played for the Green Wave from 2018 to 2021.

Collegiate statistics

Professional career

Wright went undrafted in the 2022 NFL Draft, but he signed with the Minnesota Vikings on April 30, 2022. He competed with incumbent punter Jordan Berry in training camp. On August 25, 2022, the Vikings released Berry, leaving Wright as the sole punter on the roster.

In week 6 of the 2022 season, Wright was named NFC Special Teams Player of the Week for the first time in his career for the 10-punt day he had against the Miami Dolphins, including a career-long 73-yard punt.

References

External links
 Minnesota Vikings bio
 Tulane Green Wave bio

2000 births
Living people
People from San Ramon, California
Players of American football from California
Minnesota Vikings players
American football punters
Tulane Green Wave football players